Rhizobium gallicum is a Gram-negative root-nodule bacterium. It forms nitrogen-fixing root nodules on legumes, being first isolated from those of Phaseolus vulgaris.

References

Further reading

External links

Rhizobiaceae
Bacteria described in 1997